Nsiika is a town in Buhweju District, in Western Uganda. It is the main municipal, administrative and commercial center in Buhweju District, and is the location of the district headquarters.

Location
The coordinates of Nsiika are: 0°20'53.0"S, 30°26'04.0"E (Latitude:-0.348056; Longitude:30.434444).

Overview
The population of the town of Nsiika is not publicly known, but as of 31 October 2013, there were 1,046 registered voters in Nsiika Town Council.

The town attained town council status in 2010 when Buhweju became a district. The town faces my challenges, including lack of tarmac road, lack of a sewerage system, absence of a central garbage disposal system and absence of centralized grid electricity. However, the town has piped water and about 93 percent of the town-inhabitants have access to it.

Points of interest
The following points of interest lie within the town limits or near the edges of town:

 The headquarters of Buhweju District Administration
 The offices of Nsiika Town Council
 Nsiika Central Market
 Nsiika Fair Lodge, Restaurant and Shop

See also
Buhweju District
Buhweju Kingdom
Ankole sub-region
Western Region, Uganda

References

External links
Location of Nsiika At Google Maps

Populated places in Western Region, Uganda
Cities in the Great Rift Valley
Ankole
Buhweju District